Christopher Cain (born October 29, 1943) is an American director, screenwriter, and producer. 

Cain was born in Sioux Falls, South Dakota. In 1969, he married Sharon Thomas, and adopted her two sons, Roger and Dean. The couple's daughter Krisinda was born in 1973.

Filmography
 Grand Jury (1976), director, producer, writer
 Elmer (1976), director, writer
 Sixth and Main (1977), director, producer, writer
 Charlie and the Talking Buzzard (1979), director, writer
 The Stone Boy (1984), director
 That Was Then... This Is Now (1985), director
 Where the River Runs Black (1986), director
 The Principal (1987), director
 Young Guns (1988), director, producer, writer
 Wheels of Terror (1990) (TV), director
 Lakota Moon (1992) (TV), director
 Pure Country (1992), director
 The Next Karate Kid (1994), director
 The Amazing Panda Adventure (1995), director
 Gone Fishin' (1997), director
 Rose Hill (1997) (TV), director
 A Father's Choice (2000) (TV), director
 PC and the Web (2001), director
 September Dawn (2007), director, producer
 Pure Country 2: The Gift (2010), director, producer, writer
 Deep in the Heart (2012), director

References

External links
 

1943 births
Living people
Writers from Sioux Falls, South Dakota
American film producers
American male screenwriters
Film directors from South Dakota
Screenwriters from South Dakota